Sacrifice is a 2010 Chinese historical drama film directed by Chen Kaige, starring Ge You, Wang Xueqi, Huang Xiaoming, Fan Bingbing and Vincent Zhao. It is based on the Yuan dynasty play The Orphan of Zhao by Ji Junxiang. It was distributed in the United States by Samuel Goldwyn Films.

Plot
The story is set in Jin, a ducal state under the Zhou dynasty, during the Spring and Autumn period in ancient China. Zhao Dun, the chancellor of Jin, and his son, General Zhao Shuo, have a feud with General Tu'an Gu. Tu'an Gu secretly murders the Duke of Jin and pushes the blame to the Zhao family, using that as an excuse to massacre the Zhao family. The sole survivor is Zhao Shuo's baby son, Zhao Wu, whose mother is the Duke's elder sister, Lady Zhuang. Lady Zhuang pleads with Tu'an Gu's subordinate, Han Jue, to spare her child. She then instructs Cheng Ying, a physician, to bring the child to Gongsun Chujiu, a friend of the Zhao family, before committing suicide. When Tu'an Gu learns that the orphan had escaped, he slashes his sword at Han Jue's face in anger and disfigures him. Tu'an Gu then issues an order to seal the gates and to gather all newborn babies in the city. The plan was to identify the Zhao orphan since Tu'an Gu was counting on the person hiding the baby to not hand over the baby to him, hence singling out the one baby left in the city to be the Zhao infant.

Cheng Ying brings the baby Zhao Wu home, but his wife gives the child to the searching soldiers. Cheng Ying then asks Gongsun Chujiu to bring his wife and his real son (disguised as Zhao Wu) out of the city, while he stays behind to try and retrieve Zhao Wu from Tu'an Gu. Tu'an Gu finds Cheng Ying suspicious, but Cheng lies that the Zhao orphan has been taken out of the city by Gongsun Chujiu. Tu'an Gu then leads his soldiers to Gongsun Chujiu's house and finds Cheng Ying's wife and son. Mistaking Cheng Ying's son for the Zhao orphan, Tu'an Gu kills the infant, Gongsun Chujiu and Cheng's wife.

Cheng Ying is devastated by the loss of his family and he swears vengeance on Tu'an Gu. He pretends to pledge allegiance to Tu'an Gu and brings Zhao Wu along with him and raises the child in Tu'an's house. Tu'an Gu mistakenly believes that Zhao Wu is Cheng Ying's son and adopts Zhao Wu as his godson. Zhao Wu gradually grows up under Tu'an Gu's tutelage and develops a close bond with Tu'an. Cheng Ying also forges a close friendship with the disfigured Han Jue and they secretly plot to help Zhao Wu avenge his family.

One day, Cheng Ying breaks the truth to Zhao Wu, telling him that Tu'an Gu, who has been a fatherly figure to him for the past 15 years, is actually the murderer of his family. Zhao Wu is unable to accept the truth initially but his attitude changes as he hears from Han Jue about how Cheng Ying sacrificed his own son to save him. Zhao Wu and Cheng Ying finally confront Tu'an Gu, but Tu'an is aware of Zhao's true identity, because, over the years, he has noticed that the boy resembles Zhao Shuo. Zhao Wu engages Tu'an Gu in a sword fight but is no match for the latter. At the critical moment, Cheng Ying sacrifices himself to give Zhao Wu an opportunity to stab and kill Tu'an Gu. The film ends with a dying Cheng Ying having a vision of his reunion with his family.

Cast
 Ge You as Cheng Ying, a physician.
 Wang Xueqi as Tu'an Gu, a general.
 Zhang Fengyi as Gongsun Chujiu, an official and a friend of the Zhao family.
 Vincent Zhao as Zhao Shuo, a general and Zhao Dun's son.
 Fan Bingbing as Lady Zhuang, Zhao Shuo's wife and Duke Ling's elder sister.
 Huang Xiaoming as Han Jue, Tu'an Gu's subordinate.
 Bao Guo'an as Zhao Dun, the chancellor.
 Peng Bo as Duke Ling of Jin, the ruler of Jin.
 Li Dongxue as Timi Ming, Zhao Dun's bodyguard.
 Zhao Wenhao as Zhao Wu, the Zhao family orphan. 
 Wang Han William as the younger Zhao Wu.
 Hai Qing as Cheng Ying's wife

See also
 List of Asian historical drama films

References

External links
 
  Sacrifice on Sina.com

2010 films
Chinese historical films
2010s Mandarin-language films
Films set in the Spring and Autumn period
Films directed by Chen Kaige
Wuxia films
The Orphan of Zhao
Films set in Shanxi
2010s historical films